The NWA Southern Tag Team Championship is any of a group of professional wrestling tag team championship titles in the National Wrestling Alliance.

Specific titles include:

 The NWA Southern Tag Team Championship (Florida version)
 The NWA Southern Tag Team Championship (Georgia version)
 The NWA Southern Tag Team Championship (Gulf Coast version)
 The NWA Southern Tag Team Championship (Knoxville version)
 The NWA Southern Tag Team Championship (Mid-America version)
 The NWA Southern Tag Team Championship (Mid-Atlantic version)

National Wrestling Alliance championships
Regional professional wrestling championships